The Maritime Circle Line (MCL) is a private harbor cruise line and operator in the Port of Hamburg, Germany, established by Gregor Mogi in 2007. The ferry service is operated on a scheduled timetable, connecting a number of Hamburg's maritime visitor attractions in the eastern port area.

Route and stations 
The Maritime Circle Line is a one-way circle line with eight stops, offering three tours daily from April to September, while the service is less regular during the winter season. The total travel time is some 2 h, with travel time between stops varying between 10 and 20 minutes. The tour can be commenced at any of the eight stops.

 St. Pauli Piers (Landungsbrücken)
 Ernst-August-Schleuse
 BallinStadt Emigration Museum
 Hafenmuseum Hamburg
 HafenCity (Internationales Maritimes Museum)
 Elbphilharmonie (Traditionsschiffhafen)
 Speicherstadt
 MS Cap San Diego

References

External links 
 maritime-circle-line.de official site 
 English language Flyer

Ferries across Elbe
Cruiseferries
Tourism in Hamburg
Ferry companies of Germany
Travel and holiday companies of Germany
Companies based in Hamburg
Transport companies established in 2007